The following elections occurred in the year 1832.

Europe

United Kingdom
 1832 United Kingdom general election
 List of MPs elected in the 1832 United Kingdom general election

North America

Canada
 1832 Newfoundland general election

United States
 1832 New York gubernatorial election
 1832 United States House of Representatives elections
 1832 United States presidential election
 1832 United States Senate elections

See also
 :Category:1832 elections

1832
Elections